Requiem of Snow is a 2005 film written by Iranian screenwriter Sholeh Shariati and directed by the Kurdish-Iranian director Jamil Rostami. It is a joint production of Iran and Iraq and also the first film to represent Iraq in the Best Foreign Language Film category at the Oscars.

Plot
In a village stricken by drought, people are praying for rain and a Kurdish girl is trying to escape from an arranged marriage when she runs into a stranger.

Awards
Best Director Award, 8th Olympia International Film Festival for Children and Young People, 2005, Greece.
Crystal Simorgh Award, Best Director, Fajr Film Festival, 2005, Iran.

External links
Awards, Olympia International Film Festival, Greece, 2005.
Requiem of Snow, Official website.
 

2005 films
2005 drama films
Films shot in Iran
Films shot in Iraq
Requiem of Snow
Kurdish films
Kurdish-language films